Hinko Hinković (born Heinrich Moses; 11 September 1854 – 3 September 1929) was a Croatian lawyer, publisher and politician.

Biography
Hinković was born in Vinica on 11 September 1854 to a Croatian-Jewish family as Heinrich Moses. He was the member of Party of Rights, one of the closest associates of Ante Starčević and member of the Freemasonry Scottish Rite. Hinković was editor of the party paper "Sloboda" (Freedom).

In November 1879, he published an article "Fiat lux!" in which he advocated a political rapprochement with the Serbs. In 1884, Hinković was elected as the Party of Rights representative in the Croatian Parliament. In the parliament, Hinković addressed King Franz Joseph I of Austria. He emphasised the sovereignty of the Croatian people, condemned the Austro-Hungarian dualism, waived the legality of the Croatian-Hungarian settlement, called for the unification of all Croatian lands (Croatia and Slavonia, Military Frontier, Dalmatia, Bosnia and Herzegovina and the Slovenia countries), protested against the excessive fortune and other abuses and condemned civil servants who turned into blind Hungarian government agitators and sowed discord among the Croats and Serbs.

In 1886, he came into conflict with Starčević and later left the party. In 1905, Hinković was one of the founders of the Croat-Serb Coalition. During World War I, he resided in exile and worked as a member of the Yugoslav Committee. During his time in the United States, Hinković has developed a strong propaganda against the Austro-Hungarian Empire and for the creation of the state of Yugoslavia. He authored numerous anticlerical brochures, spiritualist papers and anti-Austrian brochures, which were printed both in French and English. Although he converted to the Roman Catholic faith, he identified with Judaism until the day he died.

Hinković died on 3 September 1929 in Zagreb and is interred at the Mirogoj Cemetery.

References

Sources

 
 
 

1854 births
1929 deaths
People from Vinica, Varaždin County
Croatian Jews
Converts to Roman Catholicism from Judaism
Party of Rights politicians
Representatives in the Croatian Parliament (1848–1918)
Croatian lawyers
Faculty of Law, University of Zagreb alumni
Burials at Mirogoj Cemetery
Croatian Roman Catholics
Croatian Freemasons
Yugoslavism